Shikellamy is an Oneida (tribe) leader who was an overseer of the Shawnee for the Iroquois in Province of Pennsylvania during the mid-18th century.

Shikellamy may also refer to any of the following,

Shikellamy State Park, at Pennsylvania state park in Union and Northumberland Counties, named for Chief Shikellamy
Shikellamy School District, public school district in Northumberland County, Pennsylvania, named for Chief Shikellamy
Shikellamy High School, a high school that serves Northumberland and Sunbury Pennsylvania